Leong Mee Wan (born 12 August 1966) is a Malaysian retired table tennis player.

She competed in the 1988 Summer Olympics in both women's singles and doubles (with Lau Wai Cheng) events. She and Lau were the doubles winners in the 1987 Southeast Asian Games. Leong was also the women's singles champion at the 1989 Southeast Asian Games.

References

1966 births
Olympic table tennis players of Malaysia
Living people
Southeast Asian Games gold medalists for Malaysia
Southeast Asian Games medalists in table tennis
Table tennis players at the 1988 Summer Olympics
People from Ipoh
Competitors at the 1987 Southeast Asian Games
Competitors at the 1989 Southeast Asian Games
Malaysian people of Chinese descent
Malaysian female table tennis players